Annamocarya is a genus of flowering plants in the family Juglandaceae, containing only one species, Annamocarya sinensis, native to southwestern China (Guangxi, Guizhou, Yunnan) and northern Vietnam. It is related to the hickories, and was formerly included in the same genus Carya, as Carya sinensis, but also shares a number of characteristics with the walnuts in the genus Juglans. It is grouped with Carya in the subtribe Caryinae. It is sometimes called Chinese hickory or beaked hickory.

The leaflets have an entire margin, which distinguishes it from Carya, where the leaflets have a serrated margin. The flowers are catkins produced in spring, with the male catkins in clusters of five to eight together (single in Carya).

References

External links
Flora of China: Annamocarya

Caryinae
Endangered plants
Monotypic Fagales genera
Flora of China
Flora of Vietnam
Taxobox binomials not recognized by IUCN